"Ode to HIT" is the alma mater of Harbin Institute of Technology. Liu Zhongde (Class of 1957) was the lyricist and Liu Xijin was the composer. The new official version was released in 2017, and was sung by the famous Chinese soloist Yan Weiwen and The Choir of HIT. The song is sung on significant occasions, including enrollment, ceremonies and graduation.

References

Alma mater songs
Institutional songs
Harbin Institute of Technology